Killing Season is a 2013 American action thriller film written by Evan Daugherty and directed by Mark Steven Johnson for Millennium Films, as the first on-screen pairing of actors John Travolta and Robert De Niro. The film pertains to a personal fight between an American and a Serb war veteran.

Daugherty's script caught the attention of producers after winning the 2008 Script Pipeline Screenwriting Competition. The film received negative reviews from critics.

Plot 
During the Bosnian War, American troops witness atrocities and then shoot Serb soldiers they hold accountable for them.

In present-day Belgrade, Serbia, former Scorpions soldier Emil Kovač (Travolta), who survived the shootings, meets his informant to retrieve a file on American military veteran and former NATO operative Colonel Benjamin Ford (De Niro). Meanwhile, Ford has retreated to a cabin somewhere in the Appalachian Mountains of Tennessee, to try to forget the war. Now a recluse, he meets Kovač, posing as a European tourist, during a hunting trip. The two men become friendly, until Kovač reveals his true identity. Intent on revenge, he initiates a gory game of cat-and-mouse with Ford. The latter is badly injured but is quick to rebound. It is revealed that Ford shot Kovač in the back, crippling him for years. After a showdown, Kovač is overpowered by Ford. They reach a peaceful compromise, however, after understanding each other's predicament. Kovač quietly returns to Serbia, while Ford visits his son, to make up for missing his grandson's baptism.

Cast
 John Travolta as Emil Kovač
 Robert De Niro as Colonel Ben Ford (Ret.)
 Milo Ventimiglia as Chris Ford
 Elizabeth Olin as Sarah Ford
 Diana Lyubenova as Elena
 Kalin Sarmenov as Serbian
 Stefan Shterev as Bar Customer
 Joseph Oliveira as Serbian Soldier (uncredited)

Production
The project was originally set in the 1970s and titled Shrapnel.  It was being considered by John Travolta and Nicolas Cage as a project to follow up on their film Face/Off and by director John McTiernan as a directing vehicle. Subsequently renamed and modified to take place in modern-day Appalachia, and co-financed and co-produced by Corsan, Nu Image and Millennium Films, filming began on January 16, 2012, in the Appalachian Mountains of north Georgia.  Major filming was scheduled for Tallulah Gorge State Park and Black Rock Mountain State Park. The locations in Rabun County were chosen by director Mark Steven Johnson to create the effect and mood he had previously seen in the film Deliverance. Other minor filming locations included Sofia, Bulgaria, Sweetwater Creek State Park, and the Pine Mountain Gold Museum in Stockmar Park, Villa Rica. International sales for Killing Season, offered by the American Film Market, commenced on November 2, 2011, in Santa Monica.  American cellist/singer/songwriter Ben Sollee contributed solo cello performances as well as an original song, "Letting Go", for the end credits.

Release
Killing Season was released in the United States on July 12, 2013, to both the home screen and in cinemas.

Critical response
On Rotten Tomatoes it has an approval rating of 10% based on reviews from 20 critics. On Metacritic the film has a score of 29 out of 100 based on reviews from 9 critics, indicating "generally unfavorable reviews."

Boyd van Hoeij of The Hollywood Reporter wrote that the film would be better off as a "small-screen item". Joe Neumaier of the New York Daily News awarded the film one out of five stars, panning Travolta's character's Serbian accent. David DeWitt of The New York Times stated that "[i]t's not worthless, but it's not good. As a genre film, it's too ambitious; as an art film, it's too obvious."

Peter Sobczynski of RogerEbert.com called it "Badly written, ineptly staged, horribly acted, historically suspect and boring beyond belief".
Variety's Alissa Simon wrote: "The sight of Robert De Niro and John Travolta sharing the screen for the first time reps the one and only selling point of Killing Season."

References

External links 
 

2013 films
2013 action thriller films
2013 independent films
American independent films
American action thriller films
Bosnian War films
Films scored by Christopher Young
Films directed by Mark Steven Johnson
Films set in Georgia (U.S. state)
Films shot in Georgia (U.S. state)
Films shot in Bulgaria
Films with screenplays by Evan Daugherty
Films set in Serbia
Films set in Belgrade
Films shot in Belgrade
2010s English-language films
2010s American films